Fatima Mansions may refer to:

Fatima Mansions (housing), a public housing estate in Dublin, Ireland
The Fatima Mansions, a musical group named after the housing project